The Soundstage Sessions is the tenth album released by American singer-songwriter and Fleetwood Mac vocalist Stevie Nicks. Although it is the first live album of Nicks' solo career, it was produced to sound like a studio album.

Album information
The Soundstage Sessions was recorded in October 2007 before an intimate audience at WTTW's Grainger Studio in Chicago, with the set list containing 18 songs. In early 2008, Nicks went to Ocean Way Studio in Nashville with director/producer Joe Thomas to add "Nashville strings" and additional vocals to the songs that were to go on the CD. Nicks wanted the CD to sound perfect, and when asked about the project has said "I am as proud of this as anything I’ve ever done in my entire career."   The album reached #47 on the Billboard 200 with sales of 13,052 and as of February 2011, the album has sold 46,000 copies.

A cover of Dave Matthews, "Crash Into Me" was released as the lead single.

Track listing

Deluxe edition
Reprise Records released a Deluxe Edition exclusively through the Warner Bros. Records Store, which is called The Soundstage Sessions: Live in Chicago. The Deluxe Edition is a CD/DVD set, and includes new cover art, a lithograph of Nicks, and free mp3 downloads of "Rhiannon" and "The One".

DVD and Blu-ray editions
The DVD edition of this performance was released by Reprise Records as Live in Chicago. The Blu-ray edition of this performance has been available exclusively at Sears since December 1, 2008 and features a total of 16 tracks in high-definition. It does not include the performances of Dreams or the orchestral version of Landslide, both of which are included on the DVD edition.

Personnel
 Stevie Nicks – vocals, tambourine
 Vanessa Carlton – vocals, solo verse on "Circle Dance"
 Sharon Celani – backing vocals
 Lori Nicks – backing vocals
 Jana Anderson – backing vocals
 Waddy Wachtel – guitar, backing vocals
 Ricky Peterson – keyboards
 Lenny Castro – percussion
 Darrell Smith – keyboards
 Carlos Rios – guitar
 Al Ortiz – bass
 Jimmy Paxson – drums

Orchestra

 Eric Roth – conductor
 Janice MacDonald – flute
 Deb Stevenson – oboe
 Greg Flint – horn
 Christine Worthing – horn
 Guillaume Combet – violin
 Jennifer Cappelli – violin
 Carmen Llop-Kassinger – violin
 Christine Keiko Abe – violin
 Carol Cook – viola
 Jocelyn Davis-Beck – cello
 Eddie Bayers – drums
 Michael Rhodes – bass
 Joe Thomas – keyboards

Charts

References

Stevie Nicks albums
Albums produced by Waddy Wachtel
2009 live albums
2009 video albums
Live video albums
Reprise Records live albums
Reprise Records video albums